Franco Graziosi (10 July 1929 – 8 September 2021) was an Italian actor. Entering films in 1960, he made some 28 motion picture and television appearances between then and 2013. He appeared regularly in television mini-series throughout his career. In 1971, he appeared in Sergio Leone's Duck, You Sucker!.

Filmography

References

External links
 

1929 births
2021 deaths
Italian male film actors
Italian male television actors
People from Macerata
Accademia Nazionale di Arte Drammatica Silvio D'Amico alumni